Irving Henry Bartlett (1923 – July 1, 2006) was an American historian.

After graduating from Ohio Wesleyan University, Bartlett obtained his master's and doctoral degrees at Brown University. He taught at Cape Cod Community College, the Rhode Island College of Education, and the Massachusetts Institute of Technology before joining the University of Massachusetts Boston, where he was the John F. Kennedy Professor of American Civilization. Bartlett was awarded a Guggenheim Fellowship in 1966. He died in Hingham, Massachusetts on July 1, 2006, aged 83.

References

External links

1923 births
2006 deaths
Historians of the American Civil War
Brown University alumni
Ohio Wesleyan University alumni
Rhode Island College faculty
Cape Cod Community College faculty
University of Massachusetts Boston faculty
Massachusetts Institute of Technology faculty